Denton is a town in Caroline County, Maryland, United States. The population of Denton was 4,418 as of the 2010 United States Census, and it is the county seat of Caroline County.

History
Denton was established in 1781. It was first called Eden Town, for Sir Robert Eden, the last royal governor of Maryland, and over time Eden Town was shortened to Denton. The town was incorporated in 1802.

The Museum of Rural Life interprets the ag-based heritage of the town and surrounding area.

Geography
Denton is located at  (38.883853, -75.826556).

Climate
The climate in this area is characterized by hot, humid summers and generally mild to cool winters.  According to the Köppen Climate Classification system, Denton has a humid subtropical climate, abbreviated "Cfa" on climate maps.

Demographics

2010 census
As of the census of 2010, there were 4,418 people, 1,606 households, and 1,034 families living in the town. The racial makeup of the town was 71.8% White, 22.9% African American, 0.4% Native American, 0.6% Asian, 1.0% from other races, and 3.1% from two or more races. Hispanic or Latino of any race were 3.3% of the population.

There were 1,606 households, of which 38.6% had children under the age of 18 living with them, 40.7% were married couples living together, 18.7% had a female householder with no husband present, 4.9% had a male householder with no wife present, and 35.6% were non-families. 29.3% of all households were made up of individuals, and 13% had someone living alone who was 65 years of age or older. The average household size was 2.56 and the average family size was 3.17.

The median age in the town was 35.8 years. 26.6% of residents were under the age of 18; 8.2% were between the ages of 18 and 24; 27.1% were from 25 to 44; 23.1% were from 45 to 64; and 15.1% were 65 years of age or older. The gender makeup of the town was 46.7% male and 53.3% female.

2000 census
As of the census of 2000, there were 2,960 people, 1,140 households, and 697 families living in the town. The racial makeup of the town was 71.66% White, 25.44% African American, 0.34% Native American, 0.37% Asian, 0.24% from other races, and 1.96% from two or more races. Hispanic or Latino of any race were 1.86% of the population.

There were 1,140 households, out of which 31.1% had children under the age of 18 living with them, 37.7% were married couples living together, 17.7% had a female householder with no husband present, and 38.8% were non-families. 33.5% of all households were made up of individuals, and 15.0% had someone living alone who was 65 years of age or older. The average household size was 2.29 and the average family size was 2.90.

In the town, the population was spread out, with 23.3% under the age of 18, 8.3% from 18 to 24, 26.8% from 25 to 44, 19.6% from 45 to 64, and 22.0% who were 65 years of age or older. The median age was 39 years. For every 100 females, there were 87.3 males. For every 100 females age 18 and over, there were 80.4 males.

The median income for a household in the town was $34,936, and the median income for a family was $42,583. Males had a median income of $27,475 versus $20,504 for females. The per capita income for the town was $18,631. About 6.6% of families and 8.1% of the population were below the poverty line, including 7.4% of those under age 18 and 7.6% of those age 65 or over.

Government

Town officials and staff

Mayor:  Abigail W. McNinch
Town Council Members: Lester L. Branson, Dallas Lister, Walter Keith Johnson, Doncella Wilson
Town Administrator: Donald H. Mulrine Jr.
Clerk Treasurer: Karen L. Monteith
Chief of Police: Rodney R. Cox
Superintendent of Public Works: Philip E. Clark Sr.
Superintendent of Water and Wastewater Treatment: Mark Chandler.

Media
Denton is home to WKDI radio (840 AM). It also is served by a weekly newspaper, the Times-Record, and a monthly magazine, the Caroline Review.

Infrastructure

Transportation

The town is served by Maryland Routes 404, 313, 328, 16, and 619. MD 404 bypasses Denton to the north and east and serves as the main route between the Chesapeake Bay Bridge to the west and the Delaware Beaches to the east. A business route, MD 404 Business, passes through the center of Denton. MD 313 follows MD 404 around the east side of Denton and runs north to Greensboro and south to Federalsburg. MD 328 begins at MD 404 in West Denton and heads southwest to Easton. MD 16 passes to the south of Denton and heads west to Preston and Cambridge and east along MD 404 toward the Delaware border. MD 619 heads from MD 404 Business in the center of Denton north to MD 313 and MD 404 on the northern part of the town. Denton borders the Choptank River. Delmarva Community Transit provides bus service to Denton along multiple routes offering service to Easton, Federalsburg, Preston, and Greensboro.

The American Discovery Trail runs through the town.

Utilities
Delmarva Power, a subsidiary of Exelon, provides electricity to Denton. Chesapeake Utilities provides natural gas to the town. Denton Public Works provides water and sewer service along with trash collection to the town. The town's public works department provides water service to about 1,600 customers and can handle over 1,000,000 gallons in a day. The town operates the Denton Wasterwater Treatment Plant, which has an average daily flow of 800,000 gallons and can handle a peak hourly flow of 2.67 million gallons. Curbside trash collection is provided once a week to households in Denton.

Notable people
 Anna Murray-Douglass, Abolitionist
 Harry Hughes, former Maryland governor
 Sophie Kerr, author
 Sherman W. Tribbitt, former Delaware governor

Neighborhoods
 Anthony 
 Bureau
 Calvert Acres 
 Chapel Branch
 Country Club Estates
 Double Hills Estates
 Fairways
 Garland Lake
 Lor-J Estates
 Mallard Landing
 Oil City
 Pealiquor Landing
 Riding Acres 
 Riverview Gardens
 Savannah Overlook
 Smith Landing 
 Stafford Heights
 Tower Mobile Home Park
 Tuckahoe Springs
 West Denton
 Waymen Wharf
 Williston

References

External links
 

 
Towns in Maryland
Populated places in Caroline County, Maryland
County seats in Maryland
Populated places established in 1781
1781 establishments in Maryland